De Felice or De Félice (sometimes spelt da Félice, with and without an acute accent) is a surname with Italian and Swiss origins.

People

Surname "de Felice"
 Renzo De Felice, (1929–1996), Italian historian of fascism
 Emidio de Felice, Italian genealogist

Surname "de Félice"
 Fortunato de Félice, (1723–1789), 2nd Count Panzutti, physicist and encyclopedian
 Guillaume de Félice, (1803–1871), 4th Count Panzutti, theologian and abolitionist
 Philippe de Félice-Grin-Ruttley, (b. 1954), 9th Count Panzutti, international lawyer and writer
 Aurelio de Félice (1915–1996), Italian sculptor

Surname "DeFelice"
Cynthia DeFelice (born 1951), American children's author
Garth DeFelice, American football umpire
Jonathan DeFelice, American monk and college president
Frank C. DeFelice (born 1957), American elected official (Town of Durham, CT)

Education
 Ecole F. B. de Félice - a secondary school in Yverdon, Switzerland, named after Fortunato de Félice - School Website

See also
Palazzo De Felice (disambiguation)

References

Italian-language surnames
Neapolitan families